Three British Royal Yachts have been named HMY Victoria and Albert after the British Monarch and her husband:

  was a twin paddle steamer launched 25 April 1843, later renamed Osborne
 , a 360-foot steamer launched 16 January 1855
  completed in 1901

Royal Navy ship names